SingStar Dance is a 2010 competitive karaoke and dance video game for the PlayStation 3, a spin-off of the karaoke SingStar series. SingStar Dance was developed by London Studio and published by Sony Computer Entertainment. The game utilizes the PlayStation Move controller for dancing.

Music
The following track list is the line-up of music included in the release of SingStar Dance:

References

External links
Official Page @ PlayStation.com

2010 video games
Dance video games
EyeToy games
Karaoke video games
London Studio games
Multiplayer and single-player video games
PlayStation 3 games
PlayStation 3-only games
PlayStation Eye games
PlayStation Move-compatible games
SingStar
Sony Interactive Entertainment games
Video games developed in the United Kingdom